Ivan Paunić (born January 27, 1987) is a Serbian professional basketball player for Russian team Lokomotiv Kuban of the VTB United League, and of the EuroCup until the team was suspended due to the 2022 Russian invasion of Ukraine. He also represented the Serbian national basketball team internationally.

Professional career
Paunić began playing basketball at a professional level in the Adriatic League when he was a teenager, beginning with Serbian club Partizan in the 2004–05 season. He spent next season on loan at Mega Ishrana and Mornar. In 2006 he was sent to Vojvodina Srbijagas. He spent two seasons in Vojvodina, and then in 2008 went to Oostende. In December 2009 he goes to Greece and signed with Aris Thessaloniki.

In August 2010, Paunić signed with the Russian team Nizhny Novgorod where he stayed till April 2012, when he moved to Italy and signed with Virtus Bolgna for the rest of the season. Paunic was the best player and scorer in Nizhny Novgorod 

In July 2012, Paunić signed with the Ukrainian side Azovmash.  He left them in December 2012. Couple days later he signed with Lagun Aro GBC till the end of the season. On September 25, 2013, he signed a one-year deal with Baloncesto Fuenlabrada.

On October 30, 2014, he signed with Astana in Kazakhstan. On December 18, 2014, he left Astana and signed with Budućnost Podgorica for the rest of the season. 
On August 25, 2015, he returned to Baloncesto Fuenlabrada. Playing for Fuenlabrada, Ivan Paunic was the club's top scorer and best three point shooter in the league  On August 1, 2016, he re-signed with Fuenlabrada for one more season.

On September 25, 2017, he signed a contract with Turkish club Tofaş.

On April 5, 2019, he has signed with Chemidor Tehran of the Iranian Super League.

On February 13, 2020, he signed with Mega Bemax of the Basketball League of Serbia.

On October 14, 2020, he signed with Lokomotiv Kuban of the VTB United League, and of the EuroCup until the team was suspended due to the 2022 Russian invasion of Ukraine.

Serbian national team
Paunić was a member of the Serbian national team that competed at the EuroBasket 2009 in Poland and won the silver medal. He played at the 2010 FIBA World Championship in Turkey where Serbia was fourth, and at the EuroBasket 2011 in Lithuania where Serbia finished eight of 24 teams.

References

External links

 Adriatic League profile
 ACB.com profile
 BeoBasket.net profile
 Euroleague.net profile
 FIBA.com profile

1987 births
Living people
2010 FIBA World Championship players
ABA League players
Aris B.C. players
Baloncesto Fuenlabrada players
BC Astana players
BC Azovmash players
BC Nizhny Novgorod players
BC Oostende players
Gipuzkoa Basket players
Greek Basket League players
KK Budućnost players
KK Mega Basket players
KK Mornar Bar players
KK Partizan players
KK Vojvodina Srbijagas players
Liga ACB players
Medalists at the 2009 Summer Universiade
PBC Lokomotiv-Kuban players
Serbia men's national basketball team players
Serbian expatriate basketball people in Belgium
Serbian expatriate basketball people in Greece
Serbian expatriate basketball people in Italy
Serbian expatriate basketball people in Iran
Serbian expatriate basketball people in Kazakhstan
Serbian expatriate basketball people in Montenegro
Serbian expatriate basketball people in Russia
Serbian expatriate basketball people in Spain
Serbian expatriate basketball people in Turkey
Serbian expatriate basketball people in Ukraine
Serbian men's basketball players
Shooting guards
Tofaş S.K. players
Universiade gold medalists for Serbia
Universiade medalists in basketball
Universiade silver medalists for Serbia
Virtus Bologna players